The 1951 World Freestyle Wrestling Championship were held in Helsinki, Finland.

Medal table

Team ranking

Medal summary

Men's freestyle

References
FILA Database

World Wrestling Championships
Wrestling
International sports competitions in Helsinki
1951 in Finnish sport
1951 in sport wrestling
April 1951 sports events in Europe
1950s in Helsinki